Nobutada (written: 信忠, 信君 or 信尹) is a masculine Japanese given name. Notable people with the name include:

, Japanese samurai
, Japanese samurai
, Japanese poet, calligrapher, painter and diarist
, Japanese businessman
, Japanese samurai

Japanese masculine given names